El Camino Secreto (English title:The Secret Path) is a Mexican telenovela produced by Emilio Larrosa for Televisa in 1986.

Daniela Romo and Salvador Pineda starred as the protagonists, while first actor Claudio Brook, Patsy Pepping and Mar Castro starred as the main antagonists. Leticia Calderón, Gabriela Rivero and Carlos Ancira co-starred in supporting roles, with Ancira receiving special billing.

It was the last acting role for Carlos Ancira, eight months before his death from a brain tumor on October 10, 1987.

Plot
Mario and Santiago are both in love with the same woman, Martha. Martha becomes pregnant by Santiago and together they raise two daughters, Gabriela and Julieta. Mario and Santiago are involved in a diamond smuggling ring headed by Adolfo Avila, who murders Martha and blackmails both Mario and Santiago into taking the fall for it. Santiago flees with his young daughters, using his skills as an actor and master of disguise to assume the new identity of Fausto Guillén and the girls grow up unaware of his past as Santiago.

Twenty years later, the now wealthy Mario discovers that he is dying, so he seeks out Santiago and asks him to take his place. But Adolfo murders the ailing Mario, and Santiago is forced to hastily adopt Mario's identity in order to throw Adolfo off track, while keeping from the girls that he is not Fausto, but Santiago. Meanwhile, Gabriela meets Santiago's adopted son David and they fall in love with each other. But Gabriela's physical resemblance to her mother Martha attracts Adolfo's attention, placing everyone's lives in deadly danger.

Cast
Daniela Romo as Gabriela Guillén
Salvador Pineda as David Genovés
Carlos Ancira as Santiago Guzmán/Fausto Guillén/Mario Genovés
Gabriela Rivero as Julieta Guillén
Leticia Calderón as Alma
Pedro Armendáriz Jr. as Alejandro Faidella
Claudio Brook as Adolfo Avila
Fernando Sáenz as Carlos Avila
Pilar Pellicer as Yolanda
Arsenio Campos as Roberto Zarate
Arturo Benavides as Felix
Patsy as Berta
Fidel Garriga as Abelardo
Guy De Saint Cyr as Marcos
Mar Castro as Susana
Gonzalo Sánchez as Pancholete
Damián Alcázar as José Luis
Alfredo Sevilla as Adriano
Jorge Fegán as Captain Raymundo Floriani
Ana Patricia Rojo as Paulina Faidella

Awards

References

External links

1986 telenovelas
Mexican telenovelas
1986 Mexican television series debuts
1987 Mexican television series endings
Spanish-language telenovelas
Television shows set in Mexico
Televisa telenovelas